Wahlenbergia densifolia, commonly known as the fairy bluebell, is a small herbaceous plant in the family Campanulaceae native to eastern Australia.

It blooms in the summer between October and February producing blue-purple flowers.

The species is found in New South Wales and Victoria.

References

densifolia
Flora of New South Wales
Flora of Victoria (Australia)